Rossella Giordano (born 1 December 1972 in Asti) is an Italian race walker.

Biography
Rossella Giordano won four silver medals, to senior level, at the International athletics competitions. She participated at two editions of the Summer Olympics (1996 and 2004), she has 25 caps in national team from 1996 to 2008.

National record
20000 metres walk (track): 1:30:48 ( Almada, 4 August 2000)

Achievements

National titles
She won three times the individual national championship.
3 wins in the 10 km walk (1996, 1998)
1 win in the 5000 m walk track (2006)

See also
 Italy at the European Race Walking Cup - Multiple medalists
 Italian all-time lists - 20 km walk

References

External links
 
 Rossella Giordano at RAI 
 Rossella Giordano at Marcia nel mondo 

1972 births
Living people
Italian female racewalkers
Athletics competitors of Fiamme Azzurre
Athletes (track and field) at the 1996 Summer Olympics
Athletes (track and field) at the 2004 Summer Olympics
Olympic athletes of Italy
Universiade medalists in athletics (track and field)
World Athletics Championships athletes for Italy
Universiade silver medalists for Italy
Medalists at the 1995 Summer Universiade
Medalists at the 1997 Summer Universiade
Medalists at the 1999 Summer Universiade